The Case of Marcel Duchamp is a 1984 British mystery film directed by David Rowan and starring Guy Rolfe, Raymond Francis, Harold Innocent and Juliet Hammond. Sherlock Holmes and Doctor Watson come out of retirement to solve a final case concerning the artist Marcel Duchamp.

Cast
 Guy Rolfe - Sherlock Holmes 
 Raymond Francis - Dr. Watson 
 Juliet Hammond   
 Harold Innocent   
 Bernard Kay   
 Charles Lewsen   
 Bruce Lidington 
 Sarah Mortimer 
 Jonathan Newth 
 Jeff Rawle 
 Geoffrey Russell
 Charles Spicer

References

External links

1984 films
British mystery films
1980s mystery films
1980s English-language films
1980s British films